The Azerbaijan Premier League is a professional league for men's association football clubs. At the top of the Azerbaijan football league system, it is the country's primary football competition. It is contested by 10 clubs. Seasons run from August to May, with teams playing 36 matches each (playing each team in the league four times, twice at home and twice away). The Premier League champion secures the right to play in UEFA Champions League first qualifying round. The runner up and the 3rd place winner secure right to play in UEFA Europa Conference League starting in second qualifying round.

Since 1992, a total of 8 clubs have been crowned champions of the Azerbaijani football system. The Azerbaijan Premier League was first organized in 2007 and succeeded the Top Division, which existed from 1992 to 2007. The current champions are Qarabağ, who won the title in the 2021-22 season for the ninth time.

Azerbaijan SSR Champions

1928: Progress-2 Baku
1929–33: unknown
1934: Profsoyuz Baku
1935: Stroitel Yuga Baku
1936: Stroitel Yuga Baku
1937: Lokomotiv Baku
1938: Lokomotiv Baku
1939: Lokomotiv Baku
1940: Lokomotiv Baku
1941–43: unknown
1944: Dinamo Baku
1945: Neftyanik Baku
1946: Lokomotiv Baku
1947: Trudovye Rezervy Baku
1948: KKF Baku
1949: KKF Baku
1950: Iskra Baku
1951: Ordjonikidzeneft Baku
1952: Ordjonikidzeneft Baku
1953: Ordjonikidzeneft Baku
1954: Zavod im. S.M. Budennogo Baku
1955: Ordjonikidzeneft Baku
1956: NPU Ordgonikidzeneft Baku
1957: NPU Ordjonikidzeneft Baku
1958: NPU Ordjonikidzeneft Baku
1959: Baku Teams (Spartakiada)
1960: SKA Baku
1961: Spartak Guba
1962: SKA Baku
1963: Araz Baku
1964: Polad Sumgait
1965: Vostok Baku
1966: Vostok Baku
1967: Araz Baku
1968: SKA Baku
1969: Araz Baku
1970: SKA Baku
1971: Khimik Salyany
1972: Surahanets Baku
1973: Araz Baku
1974: Araz Baku
1975: Araz Baku
1976: Araz Baku
1977: Karabakh Khankendi
1978: SKIF Baku
1979: SKA Baku
1980: Energetik Ali-Bayramly
1981: Gandjlik Baku
1982: Tokhudju Baku
1983: Termist Baku
1984: Termist Baku
1985: Khazar Sumgayit
1986: Göyəzən
1987: Araz Naxçıvan
1988: Qarabağ Ağdam
1989: Stroitel Sabirabad
1990: Qarabağ Ağdam
1991: Khazar Sumgayit

History

The 1990s
The league was dominated by teams like Neftçi, Kapaz, Turan Tovuz and Shamkir. However, financial struggles had bad impact on local clubs and most teams such as Khazri Buzovna, Shamkir, Vilash Masalli and Shafa Baku went bust due increasing debts.  In 1997, Kapaz were known for their unbeaten run as club's final record for the 1997–98 league campaign stood at 22 wins, 4 draws and 0 losses, out of 26 games total, an unbeaten run not matched in any single season by any team in an Azerbaijani league division.

The 2000s
As league entered a new century, the Neftçi found themselves facing new challengers. They were challenged by emerging Khazar Lankaran, Inter Baku and Baku in both competitions. The country's football received major blow in 2002, when UEFA imposed a two-year ban in response to a long-standing conflict between the Association of Football Federations of Azerbaijan and majority of the country's top flight clubs. The domestic championship was abandoned as a result of the conflict and the top clubs prevented their players from playing for the national team, with tax officials also probing allegations of fraud at the Azerbaijan federation. Under the management of Agaselim Mirjavadov, Khazar Lankaran finished as Azerbaijan Cup winners in 2006 and 2007, while becoming league champions in 2006–07 despite losing the title to Neftçi in 2004–05 during Championship play-off. Qarabağ was the first ever team from Azerbaijan to reach UEFA Europa League play off-round during the seasons 2009–10 and 2010–11. Few gave chances for qualification to the next round, although the Aghdam side caused quite a stir against favorites Rosenborg, Honka, Twente and Wisła Kraków.

The 2010s

The 2010s brought a bright start, with Neftçi emerged as a champion after six years of unsuccessful run. In the next season, Neftçi repeated its domestic success after sealing their seventh title in club's history. In that year, Neftçi Baku became the first Azerbaijani team which advanced to group stage of a European competition. In 2012–13 season, Neftçi managed to win three titles in a row. In 2013–14 season, Qarabağ managed to win its 2nd title after 21 years, and continue to win domestic title consecutively. In 2014, Qarabağ became the second and most successful Azerbaijani team which advanced to group stage of a European competition. After consecutive participation in Europa League, in 2017, Qarabağ became the first Azerbaijani team which advanced to group stage of a Champions League.

On 19 June 2020, the AFFA announced that the 2019–20 was officially ended without the resumption of the remains matches due to the escalating situation of the COVID-19 pandemic in Azerbaijan. As a result, Qarabağ were crowned champions for the seventh season in a row, whilst also qualifying for the 2020–21 UEFA Champions League, with Neftçi, Keşla and Sumgayit qualifying for the 2020–21 UEFA Europa League.

Competition format
The competition format follows the usual double round-robin format. During the course of a season, which lasts from August to May, each club plays every other club four times, two times at home and two times away, for a total of 28 games. Teams receive three points for a win, one point for a draw, and no points for a loss. Teams are ranked by total points, with the highest-ranked club at the end of the season crowned champion.

Beginning from 2022-23 season Azerbaijan Premier League is planned to be extended to 10 teams.

Below is a complete record of how many teams played in each season throughout the league's history;

Qualification for European competitions
The champions qualify for the UEFA Champions League, the second and third placed teams qualifies for the UEFA Europa Conference League. As of the start of the 2020–21 Azerbaijan Premier League season qualification for European competitions is as follows: champions qualify for the first qualifying round of the UEFA Champions League, runners-up and third placed team qualifies for the first qualifying round of the Conference League. A fourth spot is given to the winner of the Azerbaijan Cup, who qualify for the first qualifying round of the Conference League. If the Azerbaijan Cup winner has already qualified for European competition through their league finish, the next highest placed club in the league takes their place.

Members of the APL (2022–23 season)

Stadia and locations
Note: Table lists in alphabetical order.

Azerbaijani League Champions and Top Scorers

Performances

Performance by club

League participation
Note: The tallies below include up to the 2022–23 season. Teams denoted in bold are current participants.

 31 seasons: Neftçi, Qarabağ
 23 seasons: Shamakhi
 22 seasons: Turan Tovuz
 21 seasons: Kapaz
 18 seasons: Baku
 17 seasons: Gabala
 16 seasons: Khazar Lankaran
 12 seasons: Shuvalan, Sumgayit
 11 seasons: MOIK Baku, Viləş Masallı
 10 seasons: Shahdag Qusar
 9 seasons: ANS Pivani Bakı, Khazar Sumgayit, Shamkir, Simurq
 8 seasons: Zira
 7 seasons: ABN Barda, Energetik
 6 seasons: Karvan, Sabail, Shafa Baku
 5 seasons: Bakılı, Khazri Buzovna, Sabah
 4 seasons: Genclerbirliyi Sumqayit, İnşaatçı Baku, Ravan Baku
 3 seasons: Azeri Baku, Göyazan Qazakh, Kürmük Qakh, Mil-Muğan, Mughan, Pambiqci Neftcala, Standard Sumgayit
 2 seasons: Adliyya Baku, Araz-Naxçıvan, Avei Agstafa, Avtomobilçi Yevlax, Azerbaijan U-18, Azneftyağ Baku, Daşqın Zaqatala, İnşaatçı Sabirabad, Ümid
 1 season: Boz Qurd Samukh, Çıraqqala Siyəzən, Energetik Əli-Bayramlı, Fərid Baku, Karat Bakı, Lokomotiv İmişli, Neftqaz Bakı, Plastik Salyan, Şirvan Kürdəmir, Şirvan Şamaxı, Təfəkkür Universiteti

Soviet Top League participation

 27 seasons: Neftçi
 1 season: Kapaz (as Dynamo Kirovabad), Stroitel Baku (as Temp Baku)

Players
Azerbaijan Premier League clubs have almost complete freedom to sign whatever number and category of players they wish. There is no team or individual salary cap, no squad size limit, no age restrictions other than those applied by general employment law, no restrictions on the overall number of foreign players, and few restrictions on individual foreign players – all players with foreign nationality, including those able to claim a passport through a parent or grandparent, are eligible to play, and top players from outside the EU are able to obtain Azerbaijani work permits.

The only restriction on selection is the "Under-21 rule". This rule states that each club must include at least two players under the age of 21 in its matchday squad.  Opinions on this rule appear to be divided among APL managers.

Records
Players in the Premier League compete for the Azerbaijan Premier League Golden Boot, awarded to the top scorer at the end of each season. Nazim Aliyev is the league's all-time top scorer with 183 goals, including 39 in the 1992 season. During the 1995–96 season he became the first player to score 100 Premier League goals. Since then, 10 other players have reached the 100-goal mark.

 Biggest home win Kapaz 14–2 Shamkir (1997–98)
 Most consecutive games unbeaten Kapaz, 30 games, 1997–98
 Youngest goalscorer Orkhan Aliyev, for Sumgayit vs Gabala, 15 years old, 236 days
 Oldest player Nadir Shukurov, for Karvan vs Mughan, 42 years, 19 April 2009
 All-time top scorer Nazim Aliyev (Khazar Sumgayit, Neftçi, Qarabag, Shafa Baku, Dinamo Baku), (183 goals)
 Most APL appearances Mahmud Gurbanov, 421
 Most goals in a season Nazim Aliyev (Khazar Sumgayit), (39 goals), 1992

UEFA ranking
UEFA Country Ranking for league participation after 2018–19 European football season.

Finances

Attendances

* UEFA has suspended the league after longstanding conflict between the Association of Football Federations of Azerbaijan  and the majority of the country's top-flight clubs.

Sponsorship
The UniBank, who had sponsored the league since 2009, did not renew their sponsorship at the end of the 2011–12 season. Talks began with Topaz betting operator, and a deal was confirmed shortly afterwards.

 2009–12: Unibank Premyer Liqası
 2012–19: Topaz Premyer Liqası

In August 2019, cooperation was suspended and PFL announced a new tender for sponsorship.

As well as sponsorship for the league itself, the Premier League has a number of official partners and suppliers. The technical for the league is Nike who is providing their match ball for the season.

Insolvency events
Since the APL began, five of its member clubs have entered administration, while nearly twenty clubs liquidated. A reduction in revenue from ticket sales for APL games and club merchandise impacted negatively on club expenditure. Players were asked to consider wage cuts and team squads were reduced.

A major criticism of the Premier League in the mid-2000s was the emergence of gulf between the Premier League and the First Division. Criticism of the gap between clubs has continued, nevertheless, due to some clubs' increasing ability to spend more than the other Premier League clubs. For some clubs, including Shamkir, Karvan, Absheron, MKT-Araz who have failed to win immediate promotion back to the top flight, financial problems, including in some cases administration or even liquidation have followed.

Media coverage

Awards

Trophy

The current Azerbaijan Premier League trophy was developed by the Professional Football League of Azerbaijan and the trophy has been awarded to the champion of Azerbaijan since the end of the 2009–10 season, replacing the previous Premier League trophy that had existed for only few years.

Monthly and annual
In addition to the winner's Trophy and the individual winner's medal players receive, Azerbaijan Premier League also awards the monthly Player of the Month award. Following the season, the awards such as the Player of the Year, Manager of the Year, and Young Player of the Year from Azerbaijan Premier League are handed out.

See also
Azerbaijan First Division
Azerbaijan Cup
Football in Azerbaijan
Soviet Top League
List of foreign Azerbaijan Premier League players

References

External links
Azerbaijani Professional Football League Official website
Azerbaijani Premier League at UEFA
Azerbaijan - List of Champions, RSSSF.com
Azerbaijan Premier League summary, Soccerway

 
Azerbaijan
1
1992 establishments in Azerbaijan
Sports leagues established in 1992